Ørnulf Gulbransen (born 19 December 1916 in Kristiania (Oslo), Norway – deceased 20 February 2004 in Oslo) was a Norwegian Classical musician (flute), married 1945 to the violinist Elsa Lilian Gustavsen (b. 1921).

Career 
Gulbransen had for more than 50 years a leading position in Norwegian music. He was known as an outstanding flautist and flute teacher both in Norway and internationally. He had an immenses influence as a soloist, chamber musician and professor at the Norwegian Academy of Music, and was a catalyst for the growth and progress on the Norwegian music scene over the last half century.

Gulbransen debuted in 1938, as solo flutist in Filharmonisk Selskaps orkester (1941–71) and primarius in Den Norske Blåsekvintett (1955–72). He gave extensive education, including at Oslo Musikkonservatorium, Ingesund College of Music (Musikhögskolan Ingesund) and the Royal Danish Academy of Music in Copenhagen. He was assigned Professor at the Norwegian Academy of Music (1975–84). For his educational efforts, he was awarded the Lindemanprisen 1985. In the years 1974–91 he was additionally regular instructor for the Canadian National Youth Orchestra. After retirement in 1984 he continued teaching music at the Barratt Due Institute of Music. His recordings included the Brandenburg concertos by J.S. Bach with Rudolf Serkin and Pablo Casals.

Honors 
1956: Norwegian Music Critics Award
1985: Lindeman award, for his educational efforts

Discography 
1964: J.S. Bach: Brandenburg Concerto No. 4 & No. 5 (Columbia Masterworks Series/Sony Classical 1990), feat. Rudolf Serkin with Members of the Marlboro Festival Orchestra, conducted by Pablo Casals
1966: J.S. Bach: Brandenburg Concerto No. 2 (Columbia Masterworks Series/Sony Classical 1990), feat. Rudolf Serkin with Members of the Marlboro Festival Orchestra conducted by Pablo Casals
1976: J.S. Bach: Chromatic Fantasy, Italian Concerto & Goldberg Variations (Aria) (Columbia Masterworks Series/Sony Classical 1990, 2002), feat. Rudolf Serkin with Members of the Marlboro Festival Orchestra conducted by Pablo Casals
1991: Ørnulf Gulbransen, Flute – Radio Performances 1960–1976 (Simax Classics)
1993: Edvard Fliflet Bræin: Orchestral Works (Simax Classics), feat. Eva Knardahl & Bergen Philharmonic Orchestra conducted by Sverre Bruland & Karsten Andersen
1994: Carl Gustav Sparre Olsen & Johann Kvandal: Norwegian Music For Flute'' (Simax Classics)

References

External links
Ørnulf Gulbransen Biography in Store Norske Leksikon

1916 births
2004 deaths
Norwegian flautists
Norwegian classical musicians
Academic staff of the Norwegian Academy of Music
Academic staff of the Barratt Due Institute of Music
20th-century classical musicians
20th-century flautists